Ludwig Goldbrunner (5 March 1908 – 26 September 1981) was a German footballer. He began playing for his home club Bayern Munich in 1927, with whom he won the German championship in 1932.

Career
Goldbrunner played as a centre half 39 times for the German National team between 1933 and 1940. He played in the 1938 France World Cup but promptly retired from the team after a 4 – 2 defeat against Switzerland. He was also part of Germany's squad at the 1936 Summer Olympics.

He became known in 1937 as one of the "Breslau-Elf" (Breslau Eleven) players, after they thrashed Denmark with an 8:0 score.

He was the center half of Bayern Munich's first great side, the 1932 German champions. A year later, Goldbrunner debuted for German National team against Switzerland. In the following years Goldbrunner took turns with Reinhold Münzenberg at the center half position, but by 1936 with Münzenberg having moved to the left back position, Goldbrunner settled at the center half position permanently. During his international career, Goldbrunner played against the best center forwards in European football, namely England's George Camsell, Portugal's Fernando Peyroteo, Belgium's Raymond Braine, France's Paul Nicolas, Italy's Silvio Piola and Spain's Isidro Langara. Remarkably, only George Camsell managed to score against Goldbrunner.

When the best Bayern Munich team of all time was drawn up he was in the shortlist and many would have him on the bench, a great achievement as this would mean he's in the top 20 best players Bayern Munich history. He's included in the top 30 German footballers of all time.

References

External links

1908 births
1981 deaths
Footballers from Munich
German footballers
Germany international footballers
Olympic footballers of Germany
Footballers at the 1936 Summer Olympics
1938 FIFA World Cup players
FC Bayern Munich footballers
German football managers
FC Bayern Munich managers
TSV 1860 Munich managers
Association football defenders